The Belo Brdo mine is one of the largest lead and zinc mines in Kosovo The mine is located in Leposavić. The mine has reserves amounting to 1.34 million tonnes of ore grading 6.59% lead, 5.74% zinc and 97.4gr/t silver thus resulting 88,300 tonnes of lead, 77,000 tonnes of zinc and 131 tonnes of silver.

Notes

References

External links
Official website

Lead and zinc mines in Kosovo
North Kosovo
Leposavić